Pathways of Life may refer to:
 Pathways of Life (1916 film), an American silent short drama film
 Pathways of Life (1918 film), a German silent film